I Love You, Hater is a 2018 Philippine romantic comedy film directed by Giselle Andres, starring Joshua Garcia, Julia Barretto and Kris Aquino. It was released on July 11, 2018, by Star Cinema.

Cast 

 Kris Aquino as Sasha Imperial
 Julia Barretto as Zoey Rivera
 Joshua Garcia as Joko Macaraeg
 Ronaldo Valdez as Cesar
 John Estrada as Richard
 Al Tantay as Oxo Macaraeg
 Gio Alvarez as John
 Mark Neumann as Jano
 Markki Stroem as Antoni
 Albie Casiño as Andrew
 Ricardo Cepeda as Chito Bernardo
 Manuel Chua as Rigor Macaraeg		
 Alora Sasam as Crystal
 Kat Galang as Daisy
 Maika Rivera as Sophie
 Anna Feo as Zeny
 RB Chanco as Bianca
 Jack Salvador as Rafa

Theme song 
 The official theme song of the film is Gusto Ko Lamang sa Buhay by Unit 406 (originally performed by Itchyworms).

See also 
 List of Philippine films of 2018

References

External links 
 

2018 films
Philippine romantic comedy films
2018 romantic comedy films
2010s Tagalog-language films
Star Cinema films
2010s English-language films